Víctor Teodoro Arano Armas (born February 7, 1995) is a Mexican professional baseball pitcher for the Washington Nationals of Major League Baseball (MLB). He made his MLB debut with the Philadelphia Phillies in 2017.

Career

Los Angeles Dodgers
Arano was born in Cosamaloapan, Veracruz, Mexico.  He signed with the Los Angeles Dodgers as an international free agent in April 2013. He  made his professional debut that year with the Arizona League Dodgers and spent the whole season there, going 3–2 with a 4.20 ERA in 13 games, with eight being starts. He began 2014 with the Great Lakes Loons.

Philadelphia Phillies
On August 28, 2014, Arano was acquired by the Philadelphia Phillies as the player to be named later from an earlier trade for Roberto Hernández. He was assigned to the Clearwater Threshers, but did not pitch after being acquired by the Phillies. In 22 games (15 starts) for Great Lakes, he was 4–7 with a 4.08 ERA, and 83 strikeouts in 86 innings. In 2015, he pitched for Clearwater where he pitched to a 4–12 record and 4.72 ERA in 24 games (22 starts) and 69 strikeouts in 124 innings.

In 2016, he played with both Clearwater and the Reading Fightin Phils, compiling a combined 5–2 record and 2.26 ERA in 46 relief appearances, and 95 strikeouts in 79 innings. He was named an MiLB 2016 Philadelphia Organization All Star.  After the 2016 season Arano pitched in the Arizona Fall League.

In 2017, he pitched for Reading where he was 1–2 with a 4.19 ERA and 38 strikeouts in 38 innings in 32 appearances out of the bullpen. The Phillies selected his contract on September 12, and he made his major league debut that same night. In 10 innings pitched for the Phillies he was 1–0 with a 1.69 ERA and 13 strikeouts.

Arano began 2018 with the Phillies. He was placed on the disabled list on April 30 retroactive to April 29, and was activated on May 19. He recorded his first career save on July 4 against the Baltimore Orioles. In 2018 with the Phillies, he was 1–2 with a 2.73 ERA, and 60 strikeouts in 59 innings. He retired the first 25 batters he faced and 32 consecutive batters dating back to 2017, most by a Phillie since 1971, and held right-handed-hitters to a .207/.248/.319 slash line.

In 2019, Arano pitched in three relief appearances for the Lehigh Valley IronPigs, going 2–0 with a 0.00 ERA in four innings in which he struck out seven batters, and in three games for the Phillies, in which he was 1–0 with a 3.86 ERA in 4 innings in which he struck out seven batters. Arano missed most of the season with a right elbow injury, which eventually required arthroscopic surgery and would cause him to miss the 2020 season as well.

On January 18, 2021, Arano was designated for assignment following the acquisition of CJ Chatham.

Atlanta Braves
On January 22, 2021, Arano was claimed off waivers by the Atlanta Braves. Arano was designated for assignment by Atlanta on June 4, 2021, without having appeared in an MLB game for the team. He was outrighted to the Triple-A Gwinnett Stripers on June 6.

Washington Nationals
On November 24, 2021, Arano signed a minor league deal with the Washington Nationals. On April 7, 2022, the Nationals selected Arano's contract, adding him to their opening day roster.

On January 13, 2023, Arano agreed to a one-year, $925K contract with the Nationals, avoiding salary arbitration.

References

External links

1995 births
Living people
People from Veracruz
Major League Baseball players from Mexico
Major League Baseball pitchers
Philadelphia Phillies players
Washington Nationals players
Arizona League Dodgers players
Great Lakes Loons players
Yaquis de Obregón players
Clearwater Threshers players
Reading Fightin Phils players
Scottsdale Scorpions players